María Lorenza Loren Ferré Rangel is a Trustee of the Conservation Trust of Puerto Rico, appointed jointly by Secretary of the Interior Gail Norton and Governor Aníbal Acevedo Vilá, after serving for several years as Chair of the Trust's Board of Advisors.  She is also a Director of the Puerto Rico Center for the New Economy.

A member of the Ferré Rangel family and granddaughter of don Luis A. Ferré, Ms. Ferré holds a B.A. from Holy Cross College, an M.A. and a Graduate Degree in Museum Studies from Boston University and a Design Certificate from the New York School of Interior Design.

Professionally, she is vice president for new products at El Día, Inc., the Ferré-Rangel family holding company, and developed the City View Plaza office complex in Guaynabo, Puerto Rico.

She serves as a director of the Center for the New Economy, a San Juan-based think tank and is Vice President of the Ferré-Rangel Family Foundation.

References

http://www.fideicomiso.org
http://www.grupocne.org

Boston University alumni
Puerto Rican activists
Puerto Rican environmentalists
Puerto Rican women environmentalists
Living people
Year of birth missing (living people)